Candlestick Tower is a  sandstone butte located in the Island in the Sky District of Canyonlands National Park, in San Juan County, Utah. Its descriptive name comes from its resemblance to a candlestick. Candlestick Tower is composed of Wingate Sandstone, which is the remains of wind-borne sand dunes deposited approximately 200 million years ago in the Late Triassic.

Access to the tower is via the four-wheel-drive White Rim Road. Candlestick is situated north of Soda Springs Basin and south of Holeman Spring Basin, and the top of this geological formation rises 1,400 feet above the White Rim Road in approximately one mile. Precipitation runoff from Candlestick Tower drains into the nearby Green River via these two basins.

Climbing
The first ascent of Candlestick was made in March 1974 by Jimmy Dunn, Larry Hamilton, Doug Snively, and John Byrd. The first free ascent of Candlestick Tower was made by Glenn Randall and Kent Lugbill in 1982. The established routes on Candlestick are the  Southwest Corner, the East Face (5.10), and Two Worlds Route is an aid climb.

Climate
Spring and fall are the most favorable seasons to visit Candlestick Tower. According to the Köppen climate classification system, it is located in a Cold semi-arid climate zone, which is defined by the coldest month having an average mean temperature below −0 °C (32 °F) and at least 50% of the total annual precipitation being received during the spring and summer.

Gallery

See also
 Colorado Plateau
 Geology of the Canyonlands area

References

External links

 Canyonlands National Park National Park Service
 Candlestick Tower: weather forecast

Landforms of San Juan County, Utah
Colorado Plateau
Canyonlands National Park
Sandstone formations of the United States
Buttes of Utah
North American 1000 m summits